Elections were held in Peterborough County, Ontario on October 25, 2010 in conjunction with municipal elections across the province.

Peterborough County Council

Asphodel-Norwood

Cavan-Monaghan

Source: Official Results, Cavan-Monaghan.

Douro-Dummer

Galway-Cavendish and Harvey

Havelock-Belmont-Methuen

North Kawartha

Otonabee-South Monaghan

Source: Official Election results, Township of Otonabee-South Monaghan

Smith-Ennismore-Lakefield

Source: Official results, Township of Smith-Ennismore-Lakefield.

References

2010 Ontario municipal elections
Peterborough County